The Garrick Inn is a pub in Stratford-upon-Avon, England, located at 25 High Street, next door to Harvard House. It is reputedly the oldest pub in the town. The Garrick is located along Stratford's Historic Spine.

History 

It has been an inn within the current Elizabethan, half-timbered building since 1718. An earlier medieval building on the same site was also used as an inn.

The precise date of the construction of the current building is not known. However, it is considered to be 1596, with parts dating back to the 14th century, making it one of the oldest buildings in Stratford-upon-Avon. It is listed at Grade II*, a heritage designation for properties which are "particularly important buildings of more than special interest". Restoration of the property took place in around 1912, when a brick front added in about 1800 was replaced. Restoration also took place in 2005.

It was previously called the Greyhound, as well as the Reindeer, before its name was changed to the Garrick Inn after the actor David Garrick in 1795.

It is thought that a bout of plague may have started within the original inn in 1564 after a weaver's apprentice, Oliver Gunn, died of the disease there. The phrase "hic incepit pestis", which translates as 'here begins the plague', was written in Gunn's burial entry. However, it is unclear whether these words were added to the burial register in order to indicate the local plague outbreak starting at this location.

It is also claimed that the pub is haunted.

See also 
 Grade II* listed buildings in Stratford-on-Avon (district)
 List of pubs in the United Kingdom

Notes and references

Notes

References 

Buildings and structures completed in the 16th century
Grade II* listed buildings in Warwickshire
Grade II* listed pubs in England
Buildings and structures in Stratford-upon-Avon
Timber framed buildings in Warwickshire
16th-century architecture in England
Pubs in Warwickshire